The 1987 Paris–Nice was the 45th edition of the Paris–Nice cycle race and was held from 3 March to 9 March 1987. The race started in Paris and finished at the Col d'Èze. The race was won by Sean Kelly of the Kas team.

Route

General classification

References

1987
1987 in road cycling
1987 in French sport
March 1987 sports events in Europe
1987 Super Prestige Pernod International